Jelena Kovačević is a Serbian American engineering professor, whose research has focused on signal processing and data science. She is the first female dean of the engineering school at New York University.

Education 
Kovačević received her bachelor degree in electrical engineering from the University of Belgrade and her MS and PhD from Columbia University.

Career 
Kovačević became head of NYU's Tandon School of Engineering in 2018, the first woman to do so in the school's 164-year history.  From 2014-2018, she was department head of Electrical and Computer Engineering at Carnegie Mellon University.  Prior to that, she was a professor of biomedical engineering at Carnegie Mellon, which she joined in 2003. She was also an adjunct professor at Columbia University and worked at Bell Laboratories in New Jersey from 1991-2002.

Kovačević has written numerous papers, including two top cited articles. She has also co-authored several books, including "Wavelets and Subband Coding", "Foundations of Signal Processing" and "Fourier and Wavelet Signal Processing". A fellow of the IEEE and EUSIPCO, she is also the recipient of several awards, including the "Belgrade October Prize", the "E.I. Jury Award" from Columbia University, the "CIT Philip L. Dowd Fellowship Award" from Carnegie Mellon University and the IEEE Signal Processing Society Technical Achievement Award in 2016. She has been a keynote or invited speaker at an academic conference in Turkey. Her research interests include applying data science to a number of domains such as biology, medicine and smart infrastructure. She is also an authority on multiresolution techniques, such as wavelets and frames.

Family  

Jelena Kovačević was born in the family of Margita Kovačević and Živorad Kovačević, a Yugoslav politician, diplomat, and academic, who was the 60th Mayor of Belgrade in 1974-1982 and Yugoslavia's Ambassador to the United States in 1987-1989, when he was recalled after his disapproval of Slobodan Milosević's regime.

References

Year of birth missing (living people)
Living people
University of Belgrade alumni
Columbia School of Engineering and Applied Science alumni
Carnegie Mellon University faculty
New York University faculty
American women engineers
Serbian women engineers
Serbian engineers
Serbian emigrants to the United States
21st-century American engineers
21st-century women engineers
21st-century American women